This article lists the confirmed national football squads for the 19th Arabian Gulf Cup tournament held in Oman between January 4 and January 17, 2009. 

Caps, goals and ages as of 3 January 2008.

Group A

Head coach:

Coach:  Jorvan Vieira

Head coach:

Head coach:  Claude Le Roy

|-----
! colspan="9" bgcolor="#B0D3FB" align="left" | Goalkeepers
|----- bgcolor="#DFEDFD"
|-

|-----
! colspan="9" bgcolor="#B0D3FB" align="left" | Defenders
|----- bgcolor="#DFEDFD"
|-

|-----
! colspan="9" bgcolor="#B0D3FB" align="left" | Midfielders
|----- bgcolor="#DFEDFD"
|-

|-----
! colspan="9" bgcolor="#B0D3FB" align="left" | Strikers
|----- bgcolor="#DFEDFD"
|-

Group B

Head coach:  Bruno Metsu

|-----
! colspan="9" bgcolor="#B0D3FB" align="left" | Goalkeepers
|----- bgcolor="#DFEDFD"
|-

|-----
! colspan="9" bgcolor="#B0D3FB" align="left" | Defenders
|----- bgcolor="#DFEDFD"
|-

|-----
! colspan="9" bgcolor="#B0D3FB" align="left" | Midfielders
|----- bgcolor="#DFEDFD"
|-

|-----
! colspan="9" bgcolor="#B0D3FB" align="left" | Strikers
|----- bgcolor="#DFEDFD"
|-

Head coach:

Head coach:

Head coach:

External links 
 Official Site
 Gulf Cup website (Arabic)

References 

 

Squads